Auratonota monochroma is a species of moth of the family Tortricidae. It is found in Ecuador.

The wingspan is about 25 mm. The forewings are plain shining golden ochreous. The hindwings are creamy in the basal part and ochreous in the distal third and darkening along the edges.

References

Moths described in 2000
Auratonota
Moths of South America